The Theatre of Small Convenience was a theatre in Malvern, Worcestershire, England. In 2002 it entered the Guinness Book of World Records as the world's smallest commercial theatre, seating up to 12 people. It is less than half the size of the previous record holder, the Piccolo Theatre in Hamburg, Germany. The theatre looked like it might close on 25 February 2017 when Dennis Neale retired from the theatre. Warwickshire College Group is currently the tenant of the theatre building (April 2018) and a future programme of events is currently under consideration. The theatre is featured in a recent publication entitled Twenty Theatres You Should See Before You Die by Amber Massie-Blomfield.

The theatre was located in Edith Walk, Great Malvern. Local puppeteer Dennis Neale started work on the theatre in 1997, opening for the first show in November 1999. The theatre's name comes from the building's original purpose – it was converted from a derelict Victorian gentlemen's public convenience.

The theatre used to regularly host puppetry, professional and amateur actors, drama, poetry, storytelling and opera, and became a regular venue of the Malvern Fringe Festival. In 2005 the theatre was chosen as one of the venues for an international puppetry festival.

Productions

Quackery Codswollop (2002)
Quing (2004)
The Tale of the Snowcake Man (2004)
Tempuss Tantrum (2006)

See also
 List of theatres in the United Kingdom

References

External links
Official webpage (archived)
Panoramic view of the Theatre of Small Convenience
The British Puppet and Model Theatre Guild

Puppet theaters
Buildings and structures in Malvern, Worcestershire
Theatres in Worcestershire
Theatres completed in 1999
1999 establishments in England
Puppetry in the United Kingdom